The Chiribiquete emerald (Chlorostilbon olivaresi) is a species of hummingbird in the "emeralds", tribe Trochilini of subfamily Trochilinae. It is endemic to southern Colombia.

Taxonomy and systematics

The Chiribiquete emerald was first described in 1996. Its specific epithet olivaresi honors Fr. Antonio Olivares to recognize his contributions to Colombian ornithology and his persisting effort in building a bird collection for the Instituto de Ciencias Natural of the Universidad Nacional de Colombia.

It is monotypic.

Description

The male's bill has a black maxilla and a red mandible with a black tip. The male's upperparts are metallic green, the uppertail coverts bluish green, and the tail dark steel blue with a shallow fork. The sides of its head and neck reflect golden green. Its throat and upper breast are glittering blue-green and the rest of the underparts bright metallic green. The female's bill is black with a red tinge at the base of the mandible. The female is metallic bronze breen above and pale gray below. It has a dusky face and a white stripe behind the eye. Most of its tail is bluish green; the outer feathers have gray bases, a dark blue band near the end, and white tips.

Distribution and habitat

The Chiribiquete emerald is restricted to the Serranía de Chiribiquete, a range of flat-topped mountains straddling south central Colombia's Guaviare and Caquetá departments. There it primarily inhabits the open scrub and savanna of the range's middle and upper elevations. It also occurs in the forest at somewhat lower elevations but shuns the lowlands that surround the mesas.

Behavior

Movement

The Chiribiquete emerald is believed to be sedentary.

Feeding

The most important source of nectar for the Chiribiquete emerald is the low shrub Decagonocarpus cornutus. It takes nectar from the flowers of other shrubs and trees as well. It does not appear to defend feeding territories. It captures small insects by sallies through gaps in the vegetation and also gleans them from flowers and foliage.

Breeding

The Chiribiquete emerald probably breeds during the dry season of December to May. Its nest has not been described and nothing else is known about its breeding phenology.

Vocalization

The Chiribiquete emerald's song has not been described. When foraging it gives "a sharp, dry, scratchy 'cht'" call.

Status

The IUCN has assessed the Chiribiquete emerald as being of Least Concern, though it occupies a limited range and its population size and trend are unknown. Most of its habitat is within Chiribiquete National Park and the mountaintops have little human activity, so "there would appear to be no imminent threat to the species."

References

Chiribiquete emerald
Birds of the Colombian Amazon
Endemic birds of Colombia
Chiribiquete emerald
Taxonomy articles created by Polbot